Zinc Inc. (renamed from Cotap Inc, Jun 2016) is a San Francisco-based company that sells a mobile messaging application for businesses. Unlike consumer-focused apps such as Whatsapp and WeChat that require phone numbers, Cotap allows users to find and connect with other users who share their corporate email domain. The company was  founded in May 2013 by former Yammer executives Jim Patterson and Zack Parker. That month, Cotap announced it had received $5.5 million in a Series A funding round from Charles River Ventures and Emergence Capital Partners. Cotap received $10M in Series B funding in January 2014.

Cotap released its first app, which is available for iOS, in October 2013. In February 2014 Cotap released a native Android app. In August 2014, Cotap released a Mac and Web app alongside the announcement of cloud storage integrations with Box, Dropbox, Google Drive and OneDrive. Both iOS and Android apps, as well as the Mac and Web apps, allow users to send individual and group messages.

On raising $5M in a funding round led by Emergence Capital Partners and Charles River Ventures, Cotap changed its name to Zinc and appointed a new Chief Executive, Stacey Epstein.

In April 2017 a further $11M round of investment was raised from GE Ventures, Hearst Ventures and existing investors Emergence & Charles River.

Zinc was acquired by ServiceMax in 2019 for an undisclosed amount.

References 

Mobile software
2013 establishments in California
Defunct software companies of the United States